Alauda Ruiz de Azúa (born 1978) is a Spanish filmmaker. Her full-length debut Lullaby (2022) earned critical acclaim, and won her the Goya Award for Best New Director.

Biography 
Born in Barakaldo, Biscay, in 1978, Alauda Ruiz de Azúa earned a licentiate degree in English philology from the University of Deusto and a degree in film direction from the ECAM. Based in Madrid, she developed an early career in short films (including Clases particulares, Dicen, and Nena) and advertising. Shortly after presenting her debut feature Lullaby at the Berlinale in February 2022, she wrapped shooting of her sophomore feature Eres tú, a Netflix comedy written by Cristóbal Garrido and Adolfo Valor.

Works 
Feature films

Accolades

References 

Spanish women film directors
21st-century Spanish screenwriters
People from Barakaldo
1978 births
Living people